Medical humanities is an interdisciplinary field of medicine which includes the humanities (philosophy of medicine, medical ethics and bioethics, history of medicine, literary studies and religion), social science (psychology, medical sociology, medical anthropology, cultural studies, health geography) and the arts (literature, theater, film, and visual arts) and their application to medical education and practice.

Medical humanities uses interdisciplinary research to explore experiences of health and illness, often focusing on subjective, hidden, or invisible experience. This interdisciplinary strength has given the field a noted diversity and encouraged creative 'epistemological innovation'.

Medical humanities is sometimes conflated with health humanities which also broadly links health and social care disciplines with the arts and humanities.

Definitions
Medical humanities can be defined as an interdisciplinary, and increasingly international endeavor that draws on the creative and intellectual strengths of diverse disciplines, including literature, art, creative writing, drama, film, music, philosophy, ethical decision making, anthropology, and history, in pursuit of medical educational goals. The humanistic sciences are relevant when multiple people’s perspectives on issues are compiled together to answer questions or even create questions. The arts can provide additional perspective to the sciences.

Critical medical humanities is an approach which argues that the arts and humanities have more to offer to healthcare than simply improving medical education. It proposes that the arts and humanities offer different ways of thinking about human history, culture, behaviour and experience which can be used to dissect, critique and influence healthcare practices and priorities.

The arts
Medical books, pictures, and diagrams help medical students build an appreciation for anything in the medical field from the human body to diseases.

The medical humanities can assist medical practitioners with viewing issues from more than one perspective, such as the visual arts and culture are supposed to do. Both patients and doctors/medical professionals deal with facing decision-making. Each person’s perspective of medical ethics is different from one another due to different cultures, religions, societies, and traditions. The humanities also assist and attempt to create a closer or more meaningful relationship between medical practitioners and their peers/patients. Ethics are perceived differently from person to person, so answering ethical questions requires the viewpoints of several different people who may have different opinions of what is right from wrong.

Bioethics 

The first category is bioethics, which includes the morals of healthcare. As science and technology develop, so does healthcare and medicine, and there is discussion and debate in society and healthcare committees that go over the ethics of these certain situations that pertain to medical humanities. For example, one of these cases involves the practice of body enhancements in which the ethics of this practice are questioned due to the fact that bio-medical and technological practices are making changes to a person’s body to improve the body and/or its appearance.

Clinical ethics 

The second category in ethics of the medical humanities is clinical ethics, which refers to the respect that healthcare professionals have for patients and families, and this helps develop a sort of professionalism, respectability, and expertise that healthcare professionals must use in respect to their patients.  Another example in the ethics of the medical humanities is bias people and society have against others with disabilities, and how these disabilities correlate with success or what the disabled person is able to do.  It is unethical to judge or assume the incapability of a disabled person because disabled people are able to find ways to become successful through modern technology and even through self-determination.

Various academic institutions offer courses of study in the ethics of medical humanities. These programs help their students learn professionalism in the medical field so that they may respectfully help their patients and do what it is right in any situation that may arise.

Literature and medicine
Formerly called medicine in literature, literature and medicine is an interdisciplinary subfield of the medical humanities considered a "dialogue rather than a merger" between the literary and the medical. Literature and medicine is flourishing in undergraduate programs and in medical schools at all levels. The Pennsylvania State University College of Medicine-Hershey was the first to introduce literature into a medical school curriculum when Joanne Trautmann (Banks), an English professor, was appointed to a position in literature there in 1972. The rationale for using literature and medicine in medical education is three-fold: reading the stories of patients and writing about their experiences gives doctors in training the tools they need to better understand their patients; discussing and reflecting on literature brings the medical practitioner's biases and assumptions into focus, heightening awareness; and reading literature requires critical thinking and empathetic awareness about moral issues in medicine.

See also
 Biopolitics
 Cinemeducation, the use of film in medical education
 Disability studies
 Health communication
 Health humanities
 Medical anthropology
 Medical journalism
 Medical literature
Narrative medicine
Graphic medicine
 Philosophy of medicine
 Philosophy of healthcare
 Public health

References

Further reading
 
 http://philpapers.org/rec/HARWAS
 
Literature, Arts, and Medicine Database http://medhum.med.nyu.edu (includes works and issues)
Literature and Medicine Series http://www.kentstateuniversitypress.com/category/series/lit_med/
Literature and Medicine Track, Georgetown University School of Medicine https://web.archive.org/web/20160707114840/http://som.georgetown.edu/academics/lamt
 https://web.archive.org/web/20160818092843/http://www.fondazionelanza.it/medicalhumanities/texts/Jones%20AH,%20Literature%20and%20medicine%20an%20evolving%20canon.pdf
Teaching Literature and Medicine: Ken Kesey's One Flew over the Cuckoo's Nest. https://www.cpcc.edu/taltp/archives/.../file
Literature and Medicine, 1982 journal

External links
Medical Humanities (Articles)
Medical Humanities
 Medical Humanities (Blog)
 Journal of Medical Humanities
 Centre for Medical Humanities, Durham University (Blog)
 Medicinae Humanistica (Blog)
 Medical Humanities Research Centre (MHRC), University of Glasgow
 SCOPE: The Health Humanities Learning Lab, University of Toronto
 Northwest Narrative Medicine Collaborative - community of narrative medicine, medical humanities, and health humanities practitioners in the U.S. Pacific Northwest

 
Medical education
Theatre of the Oppressed